John Clyde Grass (born February 29, 1968) is an American football coach. He is the former head football coach at the Jacksonville State University, a position he held from 2014 until 2021. Grass joined the coaching staff of the Jacksonville State Gamecocks in 2013 as assistant head coach and offensive coordinator under Bill Clark. He previously coached high school football in the state of Alabama for over two decades.

Grass was born in Ashville, Alabama. Since he was born on February 29 (commonly known as a "leap year baby"), his date of birth is recognized as February 28.

Coaching career
Grass was named head coach of the Jacksonville State Gamecocks in 2014 after Bill Clark left to fill a coaching vacancy at UAB. During the 2014 regular season, the Gamecocks went 10–1 and received the No. 3 seed in NCAA Division I Football Championship playoffs. They won the Ohio Valley Conference outright for the first time.

During the 2015 season, the Gamecocks again won the OVC Championship outright. They narrowly lost to Auburn in an overtime game, and went on to play North Dakota St. Bison in the FCS National Championship game, where they lost 37–10. JSU's record finished at 13–2.

The 2016 season was also a successful season for Jacksonville State, where they again won the OVC Championship outright, and were granted the No. 3 seed for the FCS playoffs. Grass' third season as head coach finished during the second round of the FCS Playoffs, where they were upset by the Youngstown St. Penguins 40–24 at home.

Grass resigned as head coach at Jacksonville State on November 8, 2021 with two regular season games left to play. No reason was given, but it was a mutual decision by Grass and the administration. The following month, it was announced that Grass was hired by Clemson in an off-field analyst role.

Education and family
Grass graduated from Jacksonville State in 1990 with a bachelor's degree in physical education. He received a master's of physical education from Jacksonville State in 1997 and an Ed.S. in administration in 2010 from Lincoln Memorial University.

Grass married his wife, Jada (née Arnold) in 1995. They have three children: Jud, Jules, and Jace Cannon.

Head coaching record

College

References

External links
 Clemson profile
 Jacksonville State profile

1968 births
Living people
Clemson Tigers football coaches
Jacksonville State Gamecocks football coaches
High school football coaches in Alabama
Jacksonville State University alumni
Lincoln Memorial University alumni
People from St. Clair County, Alabama
Coaches of American football from Alabama